The Lübbenau-Kamenz railway is a single-track main line in the German states of Brandenburg and Saxony, which was originally built and operated by the Berlin-Görlitz Railway Company. It branches from the Berlin–Görlitz railway in Lübbenau and runs via Calau and Senftenberg to Kamenz in Saxony. It connects there with the Kamenz–Pirna railway.

History 

The line from Lübbenau via Großräschen, Senftenberg to Kamenz was opened in 1874. In 1882, the Berlin-Görlitz railway company was nationalised and became part of the Prussian state railways. During the time of East Germany, the Lübbenau–Senftenberg section had great significance for the local lignite industry, including the nearby opencast mines.

On 23 May 1998, the passenger traffic on the Hosena–Kamenz section was abandoned by the Verkehrsverbund Oberelbe (Oberelbe Transport Association). Freight traffic continues to run.

References

External links

Railway lines in Brandenburg
Railway lines in Saxony
Railway lines opened in 1874
1874 establishments in Germany
Buildings and structures in Oberspreewald-Lausitz